Zaleya is a genus of flowering plants in the iceplant family Aizoaceae, found in Cape Verde, Africa, Madagascar, Réunion, Socotra, West Asia, the Indian Subcontinent, Sri Lanka, Myanmar, and Australia.

Species
Currently accepted species include:
Zaleya camillei (Cordem.) H.E.K.Hartmann
Zaleya decandra (L.) Burm.f.
Zaleya galericulata (Melville) H.Eichler
Zaleya govindia (Buch.-Ham. ex G.Don) N.C.Nair
Zaleya pentandra (L.) C.Jeffrey
Zaleya redimita (Melville) Bhandari

References

Aizoaceae
Aizoaceae genera
Taxa named by Nicolaas Laurens Burman